Daria Kulagina (born 3 March 1999) is a Belarusian synchronized swimmer. She competed in the 2020 Summer Olympics.

References

1999 births
Living people
Russian synchronized swimmers
Belarusian synchronized swimmers
Synchronized swimmers at the 2020 Summer Olympics
Olympic synchronized swimmers of Belarus
Swimmers from Moscow